Myrcia fosteri is a species of plant in the family Myrtaceae. It is endemic to Panama.  It is threatened by habitat loss.

References

Endemic flora of Panama
fosteri
Vulnerable plants
Taxonomy articles created by Polbot